Adolf De Buck (1 December 1920 – 31 August 1984) was a Belgian footballer. He played in eight matches for the Belgium national football team from 1946 to 1948.

References

External links
 

1920 births
1984 deaths
Belgian footballers
Belgium international footballers
Sportspeople from Aalst, Belgium
Association football defenders
S.C. Eendracht Aalst players